(15789) 1993 SC is a trans-Neptunian object of the plutino class. The discovery was made in 1993 at the La Palma Observatory with the Isaac Newton Telescope. It was the second plutino to receive an MPC number.

KBO's found in 1993 include: (15788) 1993 SB, (15789) 1993 SC, (181708) 1993 FW, and (385185) 1993 RO.

See also
15760 Albion
List of trans-Neptunian objects
Kuiper belt

References

External links 
 MPC: List of TNOs
 Grundy, W. M.; Noll, K. S.; Stephens, D. C. "Diverse albedos of small trans-neptunian objects."  Icarus, Volume 176, Issue 1, p. 184-191 (07/2005) Abstract
 

Plutinos
19930917
1993 SC
1993 SC
1993 SC